Harry Harvey (June 4, 1873 – April 5, 1929) was a United States Marine who was awarded the United States highest honor, the Medal of Honor for "meritorious conduct" during the Philippine–American War.

Biography
Harvey was born in New York City. He joined the Marine Corps from Brooklyn in February 1898, and was honorably discharged 5 years later.

Harry Harvey is buried in the Los Angeles National Cemetery.

Medal of Honor citation
Rank and organization: Sergeant, U.S. Marine Corps. Born: June 4, 1873, New York, N.Y. Accredited to: New Jersey. G.O. No.: 55, July 19, 1901. Citation:

Citation:

Served in battle against the enemy at Benictican, 16 February 1900. Throughout this action and in the presence of the enemy, Harvey distinguished himself by meritorious conduct.

See also

List of Medal of Honor recipients

Notes

References

Military personnel from New York City
United States Marine Corps Medal of Honor recipients
1929 deaths
1873 births
American military personnel of the Philippine–American War
United States Marines
Philippine–American War recipients of the Medal of Honor